Roger John Gallaway,  (born May 23, 1948 in Sarnia, Ontario) is a Canadian educator and retired politician.  He was a member of the House of Commons of Canada from 1993 to 2006, representing the riding of Sarnia—Lambton for the Liberal Party.

He earned a Bachelor of Arts degree from the University of Western Ontario and an LL.B from the University of Windsor.  He practiced law before entering political life, and was involved in a variety of community organizations in the Sarnia area.  In 1991, he was elected mayor of Point Edward. Gallaway graduated from Sarnia Collegiate Institute and Technical School.

Political career
Two years into his tenure as mayor of the small town of Point Edward, Ontario, Gallaway took a shot at federal politics. He was first elected to parliament in the 1993 federal election, defeating Progressive Conservative incumbent Ken James by over 10,000 votes.  He was re-elected by similarly large pluralities in the elections of 1997 and 2000, and defeated Conservative candidate Marcel Beaubien by over 5,000 votes in the 2004 election.  He was defeated by Conservative Patricia Davidson by over 4,000 votes in the 2006 election.  Soon afterwards, Gallaway blamed the Liberals' ouster from Canadian government on the leadership of Paul Martin, and was the first from within the party to call for Martin's resignation as party leader.

He ran for Speaker of the House of Commons of Canada in 1997, and was eliminated on the second ballot.

Gallaway was occasionally labeled a maverick MP in the Liberal Party, particularly in later years, and was a vocal opponent of the federal gun registry for many years, and unsuccessfully attempted to cut off funding for the program in late 2004. Gallaway has also called for government funding to be withdrawn from the Canadian Broadcasting Corporation, and opposed negative option billing by cable companies in the late 1990s.

He also holds socially conservative views on some issues, although he has not emphasized these as strongly as others within the party, such as Tom Wappel and Rose-Marie Ur. Gallaway was an opponent of same-sex marriage and voted against the Civil Marriage Act, which legalized it, in 2005.

He is a personal friend and was a frequent political ally of Senator Anne Cools, and has worked with her to propose reforms to Canada's divorce laws which would have ensured greater custody rights for fathers.  In furtherance of these concerns, Gallaway served as co-chair of the Special Joint Committee on Custody and Access, which recommended shared parenting as the norm in its report, For the Sake of the Children, issued in 1998.

From December 2003 to July 2004, Gallaway served as parliamentary secretary to the Leader of the Government in the House of Commons, with special emphasis on democratic reform..

Gallaway is also a musician. He formed the band "True Grit" with several Liberal MPs, including Joe Fontana and future prime minister Jean Chrétien (who played trombone). Gallaway has also appeared in performances with Sarnia/Port Huron's International Symphony, and was the narrator of a "Child's Introduction to the Symphony".

Gallaway supported Bob Rae's unsuccessful bid to become leader of the Liberal Party of Canada in the 2006 Liberal leadership election.

Recent career
Since leaving politics, Gallaway has served as an instructor in international business law at Lambton College. He has also thrown his hat in the ring for the 2010 Point Edward municipal elections, trying to become mayor of the tiny town once again. He faced stiff competition in the race against the incumbent mayor, Dick Kirkland, and veteran councillor, Janice Robson, and he ultimately lost to Kirkland.

Electoral record

Point Edward municipal election results (Mayor), 2010

Source: Sarnia Lambton Votes

Sarnia—Lambton

Source: Elections Canada

Note: Conservative vote is compared to the total of the Canadian Alliance vote and Progressive Conservative vote in 2000 election.

Source: Elections Canada

Note: Canadian Alliance vote is compared to the Reform vote in 1997 election.

Source: Elections Canada

Source: Elections Canada

Source: Elections Canada

External links

1948 births
Lawyers in Ontario
Liberal Party of Canada MPs
Living people
Mayors of places in Ontario
Members of the House of Commons of Canada from Ontario
Members of the King's Privy Council for Canada
People from Sarnia
University of Western Ontario alumni
University of Windsor Faculty of Law alumni
21st-century Canadian politicians